The 1977–78 New York Islanders season was the sixth season for the franchise in the National Hockey League.

Offseason

NHL Draft

Regular season

Season Standings

Schedule and results

Playoffs

Round 1 (3) New York Islanders vs (6) Toronto Maple Leafs

Toronto Wins Series 4–3

Player statistics

Note: Pos = Position; GP = Games played; G = Goals; A = Assists; Pts = Points; +/- = plus/minus; PIM = Penalty minutes; PPG = Power-play goals; SHG = Short-handed goals; GWG = Game-winning goals
      MIN = Minutes played; W = Wins; L = Losses; T = Ties; GA = Goals-against; GAA = Goals-against average; SO = Shutouts;

References

 Islanders on Hockey Database

New York Islanders seasons
New York Islanders
New York Islanders
New York Islanders
New York Islanders
Patrick Division champion seasons
Western Conference (NHL) championship seasons